Monroe County is a county located in the south central part of the U.S. state of Iowa. In the early 20th century, it was a center of bituminous coal mining and in 1910 had a population of more than 25,000. As mining declined, people moved elsewhere for work. In the 2020 census, the population was 7,577. The county seat is Albia. The county, originally called Kishkekosh County after a famous chief of the Meskwaki, was renamed for James Monroe, fifth President of the United States

Geography

Major highways
 U.S. Highway 34
 Iowa Highway 5
 Iowa Highway 137

Adjacent counties
Marion County (northwest)
Mahaska County (northeast)
Wapello County (east)
Appanoose County (south)
Lucas County (west)

Demographics

2020 census
There were 3,636 housing units, of which 3,116 were occupied.

2010 census
There were 3,884 housing units, of which 3,213 were occupied.

2000 census

As of the census of 2000, there were 8,016 people, 3,228 households, and 2,211 families in the county. The population density was 18 people per square mile (7/km2). There were 3,588 housing units at an average density of 8 per square mile (3/km2). The racial makeup of the county was 98.40% White, 0.20% Black or African American, 0.36% Native American, 0.40% Asian, 0.12% from other races, and 0.51% from two or more races. 0.50% of the population were Hispanic or Latino of any race.

Of the 3,228 households, 30.50% had children under the age of 18 living with them, 56.20% were married couples living together, 8.60% had a female householder with no husband present, and 31.50% were non-families. 28.00% of households were one person, and 15.30% were one person aged 65 or older. The average household size was 2.43 and the average family size was 2.97.

In the county, the population was spread out, with 25.30% under the age of 18, 7.20% from 18 to 24, 25.00% from 25 to 44, 23.00% from 45 to 64, and 19.50% 65 or older.  The median age was 40 years. For every 100 females there were 94.90 males. For every 100 females age 18 and over, there were 92.60 males.

The median household income was $34,877 and the median family income was $41,611. Males had a median income of $31,667 versus $21,401 for females. The per capita income for the county was $17,155. About 5.60% of families and 9.00% of the population were below the poverty line, including 12.20% of those under age 18 and 5.90% of those age 65 or over.

Communities

Cities

Albia
Eddyville
Lovilia
Melrose

Unincorporated communities

Avery
Tyrone

Ghost town
Buxton, the largest town with a majority-black population in the early 20th century

Townships

 Bluff Creek
 Cedar
 Franklin
 Guilford
 Jackson
 Mantua
 Monroe
 Pleasant
 Troy
 Union
 Urbana
 Wayne

Population ranking
The population ranking of the following table is based on the 2020 census of Monroe County.

† county seat

Politics

See also

Monroe County Courthouse
National Register of Historic Places listings in Monroe County, Iowa

References

External links

County website
Albia Area Chamber of Commerce
Monroe County Hospital

 
1843 establishments in Iowa Territory
Populated places established in 1843